Parotocinclus prata is a species of catfish in the family Loricariidae. It is native to South America, where it occurs in the Da Prata River, which is part of the São Francisco River basin in Brazil. It is most often found either in clear creeks, surrounded by dense forest, with a substrate of rocks, pebbles, sand and occasionally leaf litter, or in larger water bodies with scarce marginal vegetation and an exclusively sandy substrate. The species is known to feed on cyanobacteria, diatoms, green algae, and other organic matter. It reaches 5 cm (2 inches) SL.

References 

Loricariidae
Otothyrinae
Fish of the São Francisco River basin
Fish described in 2002